The Bob Radcliffe Memorial Cup is an intermediate football competition in Northern Ireland run by the Mid-Ulster Football Association. It was introduced in 1978. The competition culminates in the final which has traditionally been played on Boxing Day.

Bob Radcliffe was Treasurer and later Secretary of the Association between the mid 1950s and early 1970s. The cup is named in his honour.

List of finals

Summary of winners

† Includes one win by reserve team
‡ All by reserve team

See also
Steel & Sons Cup
Craig Memorial Cup
Fermanagh & Western Intermediate Cup
Mid-Ulster Cup

References

Further reading
 Northern Ireland Soccer Yearbook (Ed. Malcolm Brodie) Various Editions
 Northern Ireland Football Yearbook (Ed. Marshall Gillespie) 1996/97 Edition

Association football cup competitions in Northern Ireland